The 2011–12 St. Bonaventure Bonnies men's basketball team represented St. Bonaventure University during the 2011–12 NCAA Division I men's basketball season. The Bonnies, led by fifth year head coach Mark Schmidt, played their home games at the Reilly Center and are members of the Atlantic 10 Conference. They finished the season 20–12, 10–6 in A-10 to finish in a tie for third place. They were champions of the A-10 Basketball tournament to earn the conference's automatic bid to the 2012 NCAA tournament where they lost in the second round to Florida State.

Roster

Schedule

|-
!colspan=9| Exhibition

|-
!colspan=9| Regular season

|-
!colspan=9| 2012 Atlantic 10 men's basketball tournament

|-
!colspan=9| 2012 NCAA tournament

References

St. Bonaventure Bonnies men's basketball seasons
St. Bonaventure
St. Bonaventure
St. Bonaventure Bonnies men's basketball
St. Bonaventure Bonnies men's basketball